Futsum Zeinasellassie (Ge'ez: ፉፁም ዜናሥላሴ; born 16 December 1992 in Eritrea) is an Eritrean-born American long distance runner. After running for North Central High School in Indianapolis, Indiana, Zeinasellassie ran for Northern Arizona University. He currently runs for the Hoka One One Northern Arizona Elite team.

Early life
Futsum Zeinasellassie was born in Eritrea, and was at a refugee camp in Ethiopia before moving to the United States at the age of 14. Zeinasellassie's father is a priest in the Eritrean Orthodox Tewahedo Church. He has three brothers and four sisters. Zeinasellassie was naturalized as a U.S. citizen in January 2016.

Running career

High school
While attending North Central High School, Futsum Zeinasellassie qualified for the Foot Locker Cross Country Championships three times, finishing 7th, 2nd, and 2nd. Zeinasellassie also claimed the 2011 Nike Cross Nationals individual title in 15:02, outdistancing runner-up Daniel Vertiz by an astounding 24 seconds. He also won 7 IHSAA State titles in Cross Country and Track. As a senior, Zeinasellassie claimed the Indiana cross country state record for 5000 Meters in 14:36 at the Flashrock Invitational on September 17, 2011 along with the Indiana State record at 3200 meters on the track in 8:47.75. During this time he was coached by both Byron Simpson And Rick Stover as the head coach.

Collegiate
Zeinasellassie began attending Northern Arizona University in the fall of 2012. During his freshman cross country season he finished 31st at the NCAA Cross Country Championships with a time of 29:54.10. In 2013 Zeinasellasie returned to the NCAA Cross Country Championships to finish 4th as a sophomore in 30:05.7 followed by a 3rd place showing as a junior in 30:25.3, and rounding out his cross country eligibility with a 4th place showing as a senior in 29:49.8. In 2015, Futsum Zeinasellassie set two Eritrean indoor track records in the 5000 m and 800 meters. Futsum Zeinasellassie is a 8-time NCAA Division I All-American, and 7-time  Big Sky Conference champion.

Post Collegiate/Professional
Futsum Zeinasellassie was sponsored by COROS and trained with McKirdy Trained in Flagstaff, Arizona from 2017-2022.
At the 2017 USATF championship Medtronic TC 10 Mile, Zeinasellassie was 10th USATF 10 Mile Championships/Medtronic TC 10 Mile and runner-up at the
Monterey Bay Half Marathon.
At the 2018 USATF championship Medtronic TC 10 Mile, Zeinasellassie placed 8th in 47:28.
On October 6, 2019, Zeinasellasie won the Medtronic TC 10 Mile and became the USATF 10 Mile National Champion in a time of 46:55.
On 19 January 2020,	Zeinasellassie ran 1:01:44 and placed 14th at the Aramco Houston Half Marathon in Houston, Texas.
On 7 March 2020, Zeinasellassie ran 45:38 and placed 11th at the USATF 15 km Road Running Championships in Jacksonville, Florida.
On 7 May 2022, Zeinasellassie ran 1:02:36 and placed 2nd at the USATF Half-Marathon Championships in Indianapolis, Indiana.
On 4 December 2022, Zeinasellasie won the 2022 USATF Marathon Championships at California International Marathon in 2:11:01.

Personal bests
Zeinasellassie's personal bests are:
1,500m - 3:45.04 (2014)
3,000m – 7:53.76 (2016)
5,000m – 13:34.84 (2017)
10,000m – 27:52.70 (2016)
10k - 28:55 (2022)
15k - 43:27 (2022)
10 mile - 46:53 (2022)
Half Marathon - 1:01:21 (2021)
25k - 1:14:29 (2021)
Marathon: 2:11:01 (2022)

References

External links
 
 

Living people
American male long-distance runners
Eritrean male long-distance runners
Eritrean emigrants to the United States
Eritrean refugees
Eritrean Christians
Northern Arizona Lumberjacks men's cross country runners
1992 births
Northern Arizona Lumberjacks men's track and field athletes
Track and field athletes from Indianapolis
Track and field athletes from Indiana